Stephen Ker-Fox (born 28 May 1950) is a South African cricketer. He played in two first-class matches for Border in 1980/81.

See also
 List of Border representative cricketers

References

External links
 

1950 births
Living people
South African cricketers
Border cricketers
Cricketers from East London, Eastern Cape